Light a Candle may refer to:

 "Light a Candle", a 2000 single by Daniel O'Donnell
 "Light a Candle", a song by Sarit Hadad for Israel in the Eurovision Song Contest 2002
 Light a Candle (Smokie album), 1996

See also
 To Light a Candle, a 2004 fantasy novel by Mercedes Lackey and James Mallory in the Obsidian Trilogy